{{Taxobox
| fossil_range = 
| image =Cephalaspis tenuicornis.jpg
| image_caption =Cephalaspis tenuicornis
| regnum = Animalia
| phylum = Chordata
| classis = †Osteostraci
| subclassis = †Cornuata
| ordo = †Cephalaspidida
| familia = †Cephalaspidae
| familia_authority = Huxley 1861
| subdivision_ranks = Genera
| subdivision = 
 †Cephalaspis
 †Didymaspis Lankester 1867
 †Eukeraspis Lankester 1870
 †Witaaspis| synonyms = 
}}

Cephalaspidae is an extinct family of jawless fish in the class Osteostraci.

 References 

 J. A. Moy-Thomas and R. S. Mile. 1971. Palaeozoic Fishes''
 T. H. Huxley. 1861. Preliminary essay upon the systematic arrangement of the fishes of the Devonian Epoch. Memoirs of the Geological Survey of Great Britain, decade 10 23:1-40

External links 
 
 Cephalaspidae at fossilworks.org (retrieved 16 April 2016)

Prehistoric jawless fish families
Osteostraci